Bushra Bibi Khan also known as Pinky Peerni, is the third spouse of Imran Khan, the former Prime Minister of Pakistan. She and Khan married six months before he assumed office as Prime Minister.

Early life
Bushra Bibi was born to a conservative, politically influential family from central Punjab. She belongs to the Wattoo clan, a landowning Jat group, of whom the Manekas are a sub-clan. She originates from the town of Pakpattan, located 250 km southwest of Lahore. The town is known for being home to the Shrine of Baba Farid, of whom both she and Khan are spiritual followers, and where they first met.

Personal life

First marriage
Before her marriage to Khan, Bushra Bibi was married to Khawar Maneka. Khawar Maneka was a senior Customs official and a son of Ghulam Muhammad Maneka, a former federal minister in Benazir Bhutto's cabinet. His brother Ahmad Raza Maneka is currently a member of the National Assembly of Pakistan, and is affiliated with the PML-N. They divorced in 2017.
She has three daughters and two sons from her first marriage. Her sons Musa and Ebrahim Maneka graduated from the Aitchison College in Lahore in 2013, and pursued higher education abroad. Her eldest daughter Mehru Maneka is the daughter-in-law of politician Mian Atta Muhammad Manika. Another of her daughters is also married.

On 6 August 2018, it was reported that Mehru Maneka had joined Khan's PTI following a meeting with him.

Marriage to Imran Khan
Imran Khan and Bushra Bibi reportedly met for the first time in 2015. According to Dawn, Khan, noted for his increasing inclination towards Sufism in recent decades, was a frequent visitor of Baba Farid's shrine in Pakpattan, where he would pay homage to the renowned 12th century Sufi saint. He usually visited the town in the evening escorted by his private guards, and would later stay for a few hours at the Maneka family's residence, his local hosts, after which he would return to Islamabad. The Manekas were influential locally, and shared a "spiritual relationship" with Khan. Bushra, who was at that time married to Khawar Maneka, was a known and respected Sufi scholar, spiritual mentor and faith healer, also referred to as a pir or murshid, and this is what reportedly drew Khan closer to her. She has been described as a leader of pilgrimages to Baba Farid's shrine. During his visits, Khan would often consult her on spiritual matters whenever he found himself in a "difficult situation." 

According to Khan, the couple were introduced via Bushra Bibi sister Maryam Riaz Wattoo, who is a PTI member, whilst he was trying to understand the teachings of a 13th-century Sufi saint. He would visit Bushra Bibi house to receive counsel and advice on these and other religious matters, and "read the books she would recommend". According to sources, Khan interacted with Bushra Bibi shortly before the 2015 by-election in Lodhran for the NA-154 constituency. He became "very pleased" when his candidate Jehangir Tareen won that election, which she had correctly predicted, and started visiting and consulting her more regularly for guidance. According to a family source, Khan held "a lot of reverence for [Bushra] as a true follower." As the visits became more frequent, their personal understanding also grew. However, the prospect of marriage never surfaced until Khan learnt of Bushra's divorce. In an interview after his marriage, Khan said he "did not catch a glimpse" of his wife's face until after they were married; "I proposed to her without seeing her because she had never met me without her face being covered with a full veil." He acknowledged that he had only seen an "old photograph" of her at her house prior to that. When he finally did see her, he was not disappointed and is "now happily married."

Talking about how her life changed after marrying Imran, she said that before her marriage her life revolved around praying to God but Imran taught her that serving the helpless and needy is equally important. Khan, known for his previous relationships, insisted his attitude had changed over time and he came to believe that "the character of a person and the mind, the intellect, is much more important than the physical, because in my experience that has the smallest shelf life." He has referenced his respect to his wife based on her intellect and character. A few months after their marriage, the couple went on a pilgrimage to Makkah. Bushra has been described as an introvert who prefers to stay at home rather than attending social functions and gatherings very frequently, to which Khan admittedly has no objections, as he himself is "past the age of socialising". According to Khan, his two sons have met Bushra, while he has also had time to get to know Bushra's children following their marriage. With regards to her marriage with Imran, Bushra Bibi has clarified that, contrary to some reports in the media, her Nikkah with Imran took place seven months after the ‘Iddat period’ following the dissolution of her first marriage. Bushra Bibi has also clarified that she is not present on social media and any accounts attributed to her are fake.

As First Lady
Bushra Bibi is reportedly the first Niqab wearing spouse of a Pakistani Prime Minister. The decision to wear a Niqab, Bushra Bibi said, is her personal choice in line with religious teachings and she is not seeking to impose it on anyone else. Shortly after Khan took office, Bushra Bibi was  quoted by the media as being "afraid" and commented "I am sure Imran Khan will fulfill his promises to Pakistan. Allah has given us a great responsibility. Power comes and goes. Imran Khan aims to eliminate poverty from the country. He wants to improve the health and education system in Pakistan." Bushra Bibi has described Imran as an "extremely simple man". Talking about the PTI's slogan and promise of "change", she claimed that only Imran can bring about the promised change in the country but it would take time.

See also
 Family of Imran Khan
 Bhumman Shah

References

Living people
Pakistani spiritual teachers
Pakistani Sufis
Sufi teachers
Imran Khan family
People from Okara District
People from Pakpattan District
Spouses of prime ministers of Pakistan
Pakistani Muslims
1974 births